Fresno de Caracena is a municipality located in the province of Soria, in the autonomous community of Castile and León, Spain. It had a population of 28 inhabitants in 2013 and it is one of the less populated areas of the country. Fresno de Caracena is the birthplace of Pere Abat who is supposedly the author of the book "El Cantar del Mio Cid".

Fresno de Caracena is also the location of a 12th-century church and a rollo picota used in the past to hang criminals.

Fresno de carcena was also visited by the well known artist "Melendi" who gave to the population a great performance. Nowadays, Fresno de Caracena has a music reputation worldwide.

References

Municipalities in the Province of Soria